7-a-side football at the 2010 Asian Para Games were held in Huagong Stadium 13 – 18 December  2010. There was 1 gold medal in this sport.

Participating teams and officials

Qualifying 
A total of five teams will qualify to compete in the football five a side competition. The host nation (China) automatically qualifies a team. A team may consist of a maximum of 14 athletes.

Squads 
The individual teams contact following football gamblers on to:

Venues 
The venues to be used for the World Championships were located in Guangzhou.

Format 

The first round, or group stage, was a competition between the 4 teams in one group, where engaged in a round-robin tournament within itself. In both of the best placed, they play in the final for the tournament, the two last teams play for third place.

Classification
Athletes with a physical disability competed. The athlete's disability was caused by a non-progressive brain damage that affects motor control, such as cerebral palsy, traumatic brain injury or stroke. Athletes must be ambulant.

Players were classified by level of disability.
 C5: Athletes with difficulties when walking and running, but not in standing or when kicking the ball.
 C6: Athletes with control and co-ordination problems of their upper limbs, especially when running.
 C7: Athletes with hemiplegia.
 C8: Athletes with minimal disability; must meet eligibility criteria and have an impairment that has impact on the sport of football.

Teams must field at least one class C5 or C6 player at all times. No more than two players of class C8 are permitted to play at the same time.

Group stage 
In the first group stage have seen the teams in a one group of four teams.

Semi-finals

Finals

Bronze-medal match

Gold-medal match

Statistics

Ranking

See also

References

External links 
 Cerebral Palsy International Sports & Recreation Association (CPISRA)
 International Federation of Cerebral Palsy Football (IFCPF)

2010
Para Games
2010 Asian Para Games events
Football 7
2010